El Bagre  is a town and municipality in the Colombian department of Antioquia.

References

Municipalities of Antioquia Department